The 2015 FEU Tamaraws Men's Basketball team represents Far Eastern University during the University Athletic Association of the Philippines' 78th season in men's basketball division. The Tamaraws are led by their third year coach Nash Racela.

The Tamaraws won the UAAP Season 78 finals after defeating the UST Growling Tigers in 3 games, their first title since 2005 and 20th title overall. It is also the final season for 6 players, namely Mike Tolomia, Mike Belo, Roger Pogoy, Russel Escoto, Achie Inigo and Alfrancis Tamsi.

Off season

Departures

Roster

Rotation

Players' Statistics

Source: PBA-Online.net

Schedule

|-
!colspan=12 style="background:#006400; color:#FFD700;"| UAAP Season 78 First Round

|-
!colspan=12 style="background:#006400; color:#FFD700;"| UAAP Season 78 Second Round

|-
!colspan=12 style="background:#006400; color:#FFD700;"| UAAP Season 78 Final Four

|-
!colspan=12 style="background:#006400; color:#FFD700;"| UAAP Season 78 Finals

References

2015
Tam